Dutchman Hardwell, in his career as a DJ and musician, has received numerous awards and nominations.

DJ Awards

DJ Magazine top 100 DJs

International Dance Music Awards

MTV European Music Awards

NRJ Music Awards

World Dance Music Radio Awards

References 

Hardwell